{{DISPLAYTITLE:C11H12N2O3}}
The molecular formula C11H12N2O3 (molar mass: 220.23 g/mol, exact mass: 220.0848 u) may refer to:

 5-Hydroxytryptophan
 MDMAR